The AK-104 is a carbine variant of the AK-103. It's chambered to fire 7.62×39mm ammunition and thusly feeds from any standard 7.62x39 AK pattern magazine.

Design
The AK-104 is a 314mm (12.4in) barreled carbine in the AK-100 series of rifles, the dimensions of the gun is the same to other carbines of the AK-100 series. However, the AK-104 also features a solid, side-folding polymer stock, unlike the shorter, skeleton-stocked AKS-74U. The front sight is a post adjustable for elevation in the field. Horizontal adjustment is done by the armory before issue. The AK-104 has a muzzle booster derived from the AKS-74U.

Protective coatings ensure excellent corrosion resistance of metal parts. Forearm, magazine, butt stock and pistol grip are made of high strength plastic.

The 100-series AKs are produced by the Izhmash factories in Izhevsk, Russia.

Variants

AK-105

SLR-107CR

A civilian semi-automatic rifle utilizing a gas block almost identical to the one seen on the Russian original. However the CR is distinctive in having a 16” extended barrel to comply with U.S. regulations, typically shrouded by a false extend booster or simply exposed with a simple nut threaded on at the gas block. Produced in Bulgaria and imported by Arsenal Inc.

PSAK-104

A civilian semi-automatic series of firearms meant to duplicate the aesthetic of the AK-104. Examples in the series utilize a clone more similar to that of the Russian AK-104 gas block/front sight pattern as opposed to the Bulgarian SLR-107CR variant. Based on PSAK-103, however, it is distinct from other examples by utilizing the earlier AKM pattern bolt as well as other AKM pattern parts. Produced by Palmetto State Armory of South Carolina.

KR-104
A short-barreled rifle version of the AK-104 by Kalashnikov-USA.

Small Production Examples
Due to the scarcity of AK-104 examples in the U.S. consumer market, a variety of small gunsmithing businesses and private individuals have obtained demilled AK-104 parts kits from overseas as well as a variety of U.S. made 922R compliant parts in order to build semi-automatic clones. In addition, a very small number of Saiga rifles built on the AK-104 assembly line in Izhevsk, Russia appear to have been imported and converted to the more customary AK-104 configuration.

Users

: Used By Special Operations Police and Black Cobra Unit alongside AK 103 and AK101
: Manufactured by Iranian Defense Industries Organization and used by Iranian Armed Forces and its proxy forces.
: Used by the Russian Federal Protective Service.
: Produced under license by CAVIM alongside the AK-103.
: A batch of AK-104's have reportedly been delivered to Syria's Interior Ministry Anti-Terrorism Police in the Eastern Ghouta front in Rif Dimashq.
: In service with some units of the Yemeni Army.
: Directorate of Logistics procured from Russian Federation.

Gallery

References 

7.62×39mm assault rifles
Carbines
Kalashnikov derivatives
Assault rifles of Russia
Kalashnikov Concern products
Military equipment introduced in the 2000s
ru:Автоматы Калашникова «сотой серии»
zh:AK-104突擊步槍